This is a list of the most notable films produced in Cinema of Germany during the 1960s.

For an alphabetical list of articles on West German films see :Category:West German films. For East German films made during the decade see List of East German films.

Missing films may be Austrian productions.

1960

1961

1962

1963

1964

1965

1966

1967

1968

1969

References

Sources

External links
 German film at the Internet Movie Database (maintains separate lists for West Germany and East Germany)

Films
1960s
Lists of 1960s films